Stylocidaris affinis, also known as pencil urchin or red lance urchin, is a species of sea urchin.

It can be found in Bermuda, Caribbean Sea, Gulf Of Mexico, and the Mediterranean Sea. It occurs on circalittoral and deep sedimentary bottoms near Malta.

References 

Cidaridae